was a private junior college in Bibai, Hokkaido, Japan, established in 1968. It was closed in 2017.

External links
 Official website 

Educational institutions established in 1968
Private universities and colleges in Japan
Universities and colleges in Hokkaido
Japanese junior colleges